The Spy Who Loved Flowers (also known as Hell Cats) is a 1966 Italian/Spanish co-production science fiction-Eurospy film written and directed by Umberto Lenzi (here credited as "Hubert Humphry"). Set in Paris, Geneva and Athens, it is the sequel to Super Seven Calling Cairo (1965). It starred Roger Browne and Yoko Tani.

Premise
British agent Martin Stevens is assigned to assassinate three foreign operatives who collaborated with a deceased scientist whose weaponized invention the agent himself has recovered. Halfway through the mission, Stevens discovers that the enemy has been targeting him instead and knows his every move, thus developing suspicion that there is a traitor in their midst.

Cast 
 Roger Browne as  Martin Stevens 
 Emma Danieli as  Geneviève 
 Daniele Vargas as  Harriman 
 Marino Masé as  Dick 
 Yoko Tani as  Mei Lang  
 Sal Borgese as  Il Sordo,   Harriman's henchman
 Fernando Cebrián as  Ahmed Murad 
 Tullio Altamura as  Greg Danar  
 Attilio Dottesio

Release
The Spy Who Loved Flowers was released in France on 21 December 1966 as Des fleurs pour un espion.

References

External links

1960s spy thriller films
1960s Italian-language films
Films directed by Umberto Lenzi
Italian spy thriller films
Italian science fiction action films
1960s science fiction action films
Italian sequel films
1960s Italian films